On 7 December 2021, armed men attacked a bus in Sokoto State in northwestern Nigeria. The gunmen, apparently part of a bandit group, ambushed the vehicle on a road between Sabon Birni and Gidan Bawa. They set fire to the bus, killing about 30 people.

References

Sokoto State
Massacres in 2021
December 2021 crimes in Africa
December 2021 events in Africa
2020s massacres in Nigeria
2021 murders in Nigeria